Earl Orlin Anderson (born February 24, 1951) is an American former professional ice hockey player who played 109 regular games in the National Hockey League for the Boston Bruins and Detroit Red Wings between 1973 and 1977. His career was cut short by injuries. Anderson was also a member of the American national team at the 1973 World Championship Pool B, which was held in Austria.

Career statistics

Regular season and playoffs

International

External links

Earl Anderson @ Hockeydraftcentral.com

1951 births
Living people
People from Roseau, Minnesota
American men's ice hockey right wingers
Boston Bruins players
Detroit Red Wings draft picks
Detroit Red Wings players
Ice hockey players from Minnesota
London Lions (ice hockey) players
North Dakota Fighting Hawks men's ice hockey players
Rochester Americans players
Virginia Wings players